Coelogyne mayeriana is a species of orchid. It occurs in Malaysia, Sumatra, Java and Borneo.

mayeriana